Madame Édouard is a French comedy crime film directed by Nadine Monfils.

Plot
In Brussels, one discovers the bodies of young women buried behind the tombs of famous painters ... In each of them, it lacks the right forearm. Yarn needles, Commissioner Leon, whose secret passion is knitting, unravels the intrigue of this dark history, with the heart of this case Mrs. Edward Island, transvestite housekeeper bistro "In Sudden Death," where one encounters a high wildlife colors.

Cast

 Michel Blanc as Commissioner Léon
 Didier Bourdon as Irma
 Dominique Lavanant as Rose
 Annie Cordy as Ginette
 Josiane Balasko as Nina Tchitchi
 Rufus as Valdès
 Bouli Lanners as Gégé
 Olivier Broche as Bornéo
 Julie-Anne Roth as Marie
 Fabienne Chaudat as Mimi
 Andréa Ferréol as The butcher
 Philippe Grand'Henry as Jeannot
 Valérie Bodson as Carine 
 Erik Dewulf as Bobby Rousky

References

External links

French crime comedy films
2000s French-language films
2000s crime comedy films
2004 comedy films
2004 films
2000s French films